Hierodula aruana is a species of praying mantis in the family Mantidae.

References

aruana
Articles created by Qbugbot
Insects described in 1889